Kathryn Foster  is an American soap opera producer and director. She resigned in October 2006 after being on The Young and the Restless for about 15 years.

Positions held
The Young and the Restless
 Producer (2002–2006)
 Director (1989–2006)
 Associate Director (1988–1989)
 Production Associate (1986–1988)

Days of Our Lives
Director (September 5, 2007 - September 17, 2008)

The Bold and the Beautiful
Director (February 16 and 17, 2009)

Awards and nominations
Daytime Emmy Award
Nomination, 2006, Drama Series, The Young and the Restless
Nomination, 2006, Directing Team, The Young and the Restless
Nomination, 2005, Drama Series, The Young and the Restless
Nomination, 2005, Directing Team, The Young and the Restless
Win, 2004, Drama Series, The Young and the Restless
Nomination, 2004, Directing Team, The Young and the Restless
Nomination, 2003, Drama Series, The Young and the Restless
Win, 2002, Directing Team, The Young and the Restless
Win, 2001, Directing Team, The Young and the Restless
Nomination, 2000, Directing Team, The Young and the Restless
Win, 1999, Directing Team, The Young and the Restless
Win, 1998, Directing Team, The Young and the Restless
Win, 1997, Directing Team, The Young and the Restless
Win, 1996, Directing Team, The Young and the Restless
Nomination, 1995, Directing Team, The Young and the Restless
Nomination, 1994, Directing Team, The Young and the Restless
Nomination, 1993, Directing Team, The Young and the Restless
Nomination, 1992, Directing Team, The Young and the Restless
Nomination, 1991, Directing Team, The Young and the Restless
Nomination, 1990, Directing Team, The Young and the Restless
Win, 1989, Directing Team, The Young and the Restless

Directors Guild of America Award
Nomination, 1999, Directing, The Young and the Restless (Ep. #6787)
Win, 1996, Directing, The Young and the Restless (shared with Mike Denney, Robbin Phillips, Sally McDonald, Betty Rothenberg, Dan Brumett, Don Jacob, Randall Hill, Don Philip Smith, and Nora Wade.(Ep. #5875)

External links

1964 births
American television producers
American women television producers
American television directors
American women television directors
Living people
Place of birth missing (living people)
Soap opera producers
Directors Guild of America Award winners
Daytime Emmy Award winners
21st-century American women